The Lincoln Fry was a fictional item made up for a viral marketing campaign in 2005. It was supposedly a McDonald's French fry with Abraham Lincoln's likeness on it in profile. The Lincoln Fry was featured in a television commercial that ran in the U.S. during February 2005's Super Bowl XXXIX, and in a complementary blog, designed to appear to be an amateur production.

The prop fry used in the campaign was about four inches (10 cm) long and molded from polyurethane plastic. The prop was eventually purchased by the GoldenPalace.com online casino for $75,100 in an online auction intended to raise money for the Ronald McDonald House Charities.

Footnotes 

Viral marketing
McDonald's advertising
Fictional elements introduced in 2005
Abraham Lincoln